Babberich is a village in the Dutch province of Gelderland. It is in the municipality Zevenaar, about 3 km southeast of the centre of Zevenaar. It's located near the border with Germany. Until 1816, it was a part of the Duchy of Cleves.

History 
The village was first mentioned between 1357 and 1358 Babborch. The etymology is not clear. Huis Babberich has been recorded as early as 1363. In 1786, the current manor house was built. In 1816, Babberich became part of the Netherlands. In 1840, it was home to 1,144 people.

Sports and music 
The atmospheric rock band Crescent Moon is based here.

The football team SV Babberich is based here.

Gallery

References

Populated places in Gelderland
Zevenaar